The 1981 NCAA Division I women's volleyball tournament was the first year that the NCAA sponsored women's volleyball, following 12 years in which the AIAW conducted the women's national intercollegiate championships. The tournament consisted of just 20 teams.

The Final Four was held on the campus of UCLA, where the heavily favored Bruins lost in the national title match against Southern California in five games: 9-15, 15-7, 10-15, 15-13, 15-7. Southern California finished the year 27-10.

In the consolation match, San Diego State swept Pacific, 3-0,  to claim third place.

Regionals

Northwest regional

Mideast regional

South regional

West regional

Final Four – Pauley Pavilion, Los Angeles

NCAA Tournament record

There is one NCAA tournament record that was set during the 1981 tournament that still stands today.

Solo blocks, tournament (individual record) - Jayne Gibson, Pacific - 15 (2 vs. Penn State, 4 vs. Cal Poly, 6 vs. Southern California, 3 vs. San Diego State)

References

External links
Full bracket in PDF format

NCAA Women's Volleyball Championship
NCAA Division I women's volleyball tournament, 1981
1981 in sports in California
Volleyball in California
December 1981 sports events in the United States
Sports competitions in Los Angeles
Women's sports in California